Neurophyseta upupalis is a moth of the family Crambidae. It is found on Réunion in the Indian Ocean. This moth is very rare; only three specimens had been found up to the last report in 2008.

References

External links
 Picture of Neurophyseta upupalis (page 1, middle)

Musotiminae
Moths of Réunion
Moths described in 1862
Endemic fauna of Réunion